Rellik (killer spelled backwards) may refer to:

 Rellik (wrestler), American professional wrestler, real name Jon Hugger
 Rellik (TV series), a British TV series, airing on both British BBC One and American premium channel Cinemax